Kirlampudi Mandal is one of the 21 mandals in Kakinada District of Andhra Pradesh. As per census 2011, there are 17 villages.

Demographics 
Kirlampudi Mandal has total population of 74,379 as per the Census 2011 out of which 37,255 are males while 37,124 are females and the average sex Ratio of Kirlampudi Mandal is 996. The total literacy rate of Kirlampudi Mandal is 61.43%. The male literacy rate is 55.78% and the female literacy rate is 53.47%.

Villages

See also 
List of mandals in Andhra Pradesh

References 

Mandals in Kakinada district
Mandals in Andhra Pradesh